Seppo Kilponen (born 20 September 1941) is a Finnish footballer. He played in 27 matches for the Finland national football team from 1966 to 1971.

In his club career he played for OPS and OTP.

References

External links
 

1941 births
Living people
Finnish footballers
Finland international footballers
Place of birth missing (living people)
Association footballers not categorized by position